Islam is the second-largest religion in Ethiopia behind Christianity, with 31.3 to 35.9 percent of the total population of around 113.5 million people professing the religion as of 2022.

Islam in Ethiopia dates back to the founding of the religion; in 615, when a group of Muslims were counseled by Muhammad to escape persecution in Mecca and travel to Ethiopia via modern-day Eritrea, which was ruled by Najashi, a pious Christian king. It is agreed by Islamic scholars that Najashi gave shelter to the Muslim refugees around 615–616 at Axum. Bilal ibn Ribah, the first Muezzin, the person chosen to call the faithful to prayer, and one of the foremost companions of Muhammad, was born in Mecca to an Abyssinian (Ethiopian) mother.

Introduction 

 Islam was in 2007 the second largest religion in Ethiopia with over 33.9% of the population. The faith arrived in Tigray, north of Ethiopia, at an early date, shortly before the hijira. The Kingdom of Aksum in Ethiopia was the first foreign country to accept Islam when it was unknown in most parts of the world. The kingdom also favored its expansion and making Islam present in the country since the times of Muhammad (571-632). Islam and Christianity are the two major religions and have co-existed for hundreds of years.

History

Muslims arrived in the Axumite Empire during the Hijarat as early disciples from Mecca, persecuted by the ruling Quraysh tribe. They were received by the Christian ruler of Axum, whom Arabic tradition has named Ashama ibn Abjar (King Armah in Ge'Ez and Amharic), and he settled them in Negash. Located in the Tigray Region. On the other hand, the principal center of Islamic culture, learning, and propagation has been Wello. The Quraysh sent emissaries to bring them back to Arabia, but the King of Axum refused their demands. The Prophet himself instructed his followers who came to the Axumite empire, to respect and protect Axum as well as live in peace with the native Christians. While the city of Medina, north of Mecca, ultimately became the new home of most of the exiles from Mecca, a 7th-century cemetery excavated inside the boundaries of Negash shows the Muslim community survived their departure.

The period of Fasilides (r.1632-1667) gave Muslims a good opportunity to expand their religion throughout the country. Emperor Yohannis (r.1667-1682) created a council of Muslims to establish their own quarters in Addis Alem, far from the Christians in the political commercial capital, Gondar town. Muslims were able to have their own space and the population of Muslims increased because of wider urbanization.

Islam and Christianity have had their conflicts within the country, from the birth of Islam into the 16th century Christians dominated the borderlands where Islam was more prominent. This brought about the settlement of Islam to Ethiopia and the Horn of Africa. In the Dahlak islands, the first Muslims resided in the 8th century until the 10th century where Islam spread along the Red Sea and Islam was restricted to northern Ethiopia because Christianity was already more dominant in the rest of the country. The port of Zeila allowed Islam to enter through the eastern and central parts of Ethiopia where Christianity had not reached yet.

During the 19th century, Emperor Tewodros II (r.1855-1868) demanded that his Muslim subjects convert to Christianity or leave his empire. Some Muslims converted due to coercion and those who didn't moved to the western parts of the Gojjam near Sudan where they continued practicing Islam. Emperor Tewodros II successor, Emperor Yohannes IV (r.1872-1889) continued to coerce Muslims into converting to achieve religious uniformity by ordering them to be baptized within three years.

Islam developed more rapidly in the eastern part of the Horn region, particularly among the Somali and Harari. This was challenged by the mostly Christian northern people of Abyssinia, including Amhara, Tigray and north western Oromo. However the north and northeastern expansion of the Oromo, who practiced mainstream traditional Waaqa, affected the growth of Islam in its early days. Historian Ulrich Braukamper says, "the expansion of the non-Muslim Oromo people during subsequent centuries mostly eliminated Islam in those areas." However, following the centralization of some Oromo communities, some of them adopted Islam and today constitutes over 50% of their population.

In the 16th century, Muslims from the Adal Sultanate embarked on a Conquest of Abyssinia (Futuh al-Habash) under the command of Ahmad ibn Ibrahim al-Ghazi (referred to as Gragn Mohammed or "Mohammed the left-handed" in Amharic).

Under the former Emperor Haile Selassie, Muslim communities could bring matters of personal and family law and inheritance before Islamic courts; many did so and probably continued to do so under the revolutionary regime. However, many Muslims dealt with such matters in terms of customary law. For example, the Somali and other pastoralists tended not to follow the requirement that daughters inherit half as much property as sons, particularly when livestock was at issue. In parts of Eritrea, the tendency to treat land as the corporate property of a descent group (lineage or clan) precluded following the Islamic principle of division of property among one's heirs.

The First Hijrah

When Mohammed saw the persecution to which his followers were subjected to in Mecca, he told them to find safe haven in northern Ethiopia, Abyssinia, where they would "find a king there who does not wrong anyone." It was the first hijra (migration) in Islamic history.

The persecution his followers suffered was due to polytheists who harmed the weaker Muslims and blackmailed richer Muslims, causing a severe decline in business. The abuse the Muslims endured eventually led people to convert while others held their Islamic beliefs. Abdullah ibn Masud was a new convert and participated in a Muslim group where a member suggested reciting the Qur’an in Masjid al-Haram because the people of the Quraysh never heard it before. Abdullah agreed to do so and the polytheists were so amazed they pounded on him until he bled to prevent the verses from affecting them.

Subsequently, because of the threats early Muslims suffered the verses from An-Nahl were revealed. According to historians, these verses were specifically sent as instructions for the migration to Abyssinia. The threats by the polytheists were so harsh it prompted the Prophet to save his people and have them migrate to Abyssinia to escape the harassment making it the first migration in Islam.

The fourth holiest Muslim city
Ethiopia is home to Harar. According to UNESCO, it is regarded as the fourth holy city of Islam. It has 82 mosques, three of which date from the 10th century, as well as 102 shrines. The city of Harar is located in Eastern Ethiopia and got its role of being an Islamic center in the 16th century AD. Harar began to develop the characteristics of an Islamic city with the Shafi‘i school in the 19th century as well as Harar serving as a conduit for the spreading of Islam in the Oromo population during an Islamization campaign under the reign of Amir Muhammad.

The 82 mosques in Harar have served a religious and social function for society. Once a day men go and pray in the mosque while the women pray at home, though construction has begun to areas where women can pray as well. Mosques would also allow Islamic learning such as the interpretation of the Quran, the Arabic language, and the principles of Islam.

Denominations

Sunni 
Muslims in Ethiopia are predominantly Sunni. In Sunni Islam, there are four schools of thought and three of them are located in Ethiopia, the main one is held by the Shafi‘i school. Roughly 98% of Ethiopian Muslims are Sunni, whilst another 2% adhere to other sects.

Shia 
Shia Islam is not represented in Ethiopia compared to other denominations.

Ibadism 
Ibadis were allegedly seen as the most admirable Muslims to be eligible for the caliphate office and are known for being the earliest sect of Islam. There are about 500,000 Ibadis residing in North and East Africa as well as Oman and Tanzania.

Islamic Orthodox 
The Orientalist notion defined Islamic Orthodoxy "as the point of departure that consequently measured other practices and beliefs as syncretistic or pre-Islamic." J. Spencer Trimingham the author of Islam in Ethiopia examined the impacts of Islam in the country and arranged his analysis by a hierarchical typology of different forms of appropriation categorized as an "orthodox system." Institutions of Islamic learning in Ethiopia were maintaining an Islamic Orthodoxy within the community.

Muslim land rights 

Muslims were one of the marginalized groups that were not allowed access to land until the 1974 revolution. The revolution brought forth major changes to the socio-political and religious position of Ethiopian Muslims. In Gojjam, most Muslims did not have access to land, but had ways to get around it. They could rent, buy land, or enter in a crop sharing verbal agreement with the landowner. Muslims did not have the right to own, administer, or inherit land they simply were only allowed to live as tenants. If a verbal agreement was not an option, another way Muslims were able to acquire land was by clearing out unoccupied land and settling there, but only if they were able to offer some type of service to the balebat. Muslims were marginalised in Ethiopia, but particularly in Gojjam.

Rise of Salafism/Wahhabism 
Salafism/Wahhabism is derived from al-salaf, signifying a link back to what is known as pure and authentic Islam. The main aspect of Salafism is the emphasis on the idea that there is only one God. In Ethiopia, the concept of Salafism applies to the resistance of pilgrimages to local shrines, celebration of the Prophet's birthday and other practices. Saudi Arabia is known for the rise of Salafism in Ethiopia, but the arrival of Salafism in Ethiopia is due to the Italian occupation from 1936 to 1941. Many Ethiopians were making their way to hajj when they were subsidized by the Italians and introducing Salafi teachings to the town of Harar, before spreading to other parts of the country.

The Wahhabism movement began to spread in the 1990s due to the political transition in 1991 and the arrival of the Ethiopian People's Revolutionary Democratic Front (EPRDF). The EPRDF promised a change within Ethiopia's religious groups through decentralizing the structure of ethnic federalism to enable Salafi's to raise their activities. During this period, a new generation of Salafi's emerged. Salafi teachings became widespread due to organizations in Ethiopia like, World Association of Muslim Youth (WAMY). the Islamic Da'wa and Knowledge Organization, and the Awolia College. Besides the organizations the Salafi movement was led by Oromo scholars who were developing the Salafi ideology in Ethiopia. The youth became involved in the movement and began to call people to align with the obligatory practices of Islam with strict Salafi teachings.

In January 2012 to August 2013, the city Addis Ababa was swarmed with protests by Muslim demonstrators because of the alleged government enforced al-Ahbash campaigns that they Muslims viewed it as an interference in religious affairs by the regime. The protests sparked concern within the regime of what looked like “extremism,” a concept that is accredited with the Salafi movement. Within the regime, local, and international observers are claiming that Wahhabism “extremists” are wanting to gain political power to turn Ethiopia into an Islamic State. Others have argued that Ethiopian Wahhabism are reluctant and opposed to getting involved in politics. Due to the expansion of the Wahhabism movement it has brought up intense debates over religious symbols and rituals, intrinsic to Ethiopian Islam.

Sharia Court 
All around the world, Sharia courts are designed to question and make decisions regarding Muslim law. Sharia courts have existed in Ethiopia since the country accepted Islam and the influence of the religion in the coastal areas that is surrounding the country. The courts became officially recognized by the state in 1942 when the Proclamation for the Establishment of Khadis Courts was issued. The Proclamation defined the authority of the courts, but was repealed in 1994 by the Khadis and Naiba Councils Proclamation, providing a three set of courts: the Supreme Court of Sharia, the High Court of Sharia and the First Instance Court of Sharia each with its own judges and necessary number of Khadis. The Khadis and Naiba councils decide on any questions surrounding marriage such as divorce and guardianship of children all that must be related to Mohammedans law or all the parties are Muslim. Also, the councils decide on any questions about wills or succession given that the donor or deceased was a Muslim. Lastly, the courts decide on any questions regarding payments of the cost incurred by the aforementioned decisions. The provisions provided by the courts made the Ethiopian Muslim courts similar to ones Sudan, Nigeria and other Africa countries where Sharia courts exist to handle the personal laws of the Muslim population.

In terms of gender equality, sharia law has a different approach to tackling gender equality. Islamic law contains different ways to treat women that can be applied to courts for example, divorce, partition of property, inheritance and many more. Final decisions made by the Sharia court are treated as an exception to the constitutional standard of Article 9(1), which states “The Constitution is the supreme law of the land. All laws, customary practices, and decisions made by state organs or public officials inconsistent therewith, shall be null and void.” It raises a question about Ethiopia's commitment to human rights because personal status laws, which are under Ethiopia's jurisdiction of sharia courts are considered an area of law which discrimination on the basis of gender is established.

Muslims in contemporary Ethiopia

Much as the rest of the Muslim world, the beliefs and practices of the Muslims in Ethiopia are essentially the same: embodied in the Qur'an and the Sunnah. There are also Sufi brotherhoods present in Ethiopia such as the Qadiriyyah order in Wello. The most important Islamic religious practices, such as the daily ritual prayers (Salat) and fasting (Arabic صوم, Sawm, Ethiopic ጾም, S.om or Tsom - used by Christians during their holy days as well) during the holy month of Ramadan, are observed both in urban centers as well as in rural areas, among both settled peoples and nomads. Numerous Muslims in Ethiopia perform the pilgrimage to Mecca every year.

In Ethiopia's Muslim communities, as in neighboring Sudan and Somalia, many of the faithful are associated with, but not necessarily members of any specific Sufi order. Nevertheless, formal and informal attachment to Sufi practices is widespread. The emphasis seems less on the contemplative and disciplined mysticism, and more on the concentration of the spiritual powers possessed by certain founders of the orders and the leaders of local branches.

Muslims in contemporary Ethiopia have become actively engaged in challenging their political marginalization through the Ethiopian People's Revolutionary Democratic Front. They are persistent in wanting to engage with the EPRDF's basis of political legitimacy and challenging their forceful secularism that limits religion to the private domain. In the context of electoral politics, Muslims have become increasingly involved in voting blocs. Their demands include expanding into Western financial institutions, consolidation with other parts of the Islamic world and the right to religious expression freely.

See also
First migration to Abyssinia
List of non-Arab Sahaba
Islam by country
Jamāl al-Dīn b. Muḥammad al-Annī
Abadir Umar Ar-Rida
Religion in Ethiopia

References

External links
 The Muslim-Christian War (1528-1560) 
 Ethiopian History and Civilization

Further reading

 Jon Abbink, "An Historical-Anthropological Approach to Islam in Ethiopia: Issues of Identity and Politics", Journal of African Cultural Studies, 11 (1998), pp. 109–124
 Dickson, David, "Political Islam in Sub-Saharan Africa: The Need for a new Research and Diplomatic Agenda" , United States Institute of Peace, Special Report 140, May 2005.